Rip It Up is the second album released by Scottish post-punk band Orange Juice. It was released in 1982. This album contains their hit song of the same name, which reached the Top 10.  The album was included in the book 1001 Albums You Must Hear Before You Die.

Track listing
"Rip It Up" – 5:19 (Edwyn Collins, David McClymont, Malcolm Ross, Zeke Manyika)
"A Million Pleading Faces" – 3:14 (Manyika)
"Mud in Your Eye" – 3:56 (Collins)
"Turn Away" – 3:19 (Ross)
"Breakfast Time" – 5:10 (Collins)
"I Can't Help Myself" – 5:05 (Collins, McClymont)
"Flesh of My Flesh" – 3:15 (Collins)
"Louise Louise" – 2:51 (Collins)
"Hokoyo" – 5:06 (Collins, McClymont, Ross, Manyika, Zop Cormorant)
"Tenterhook" – 5:01 (Collins)
1998 Reissue Bonus Tracks
"Tongues Begin to Wag" - 4:14 (Collins, McClymont, Ross, Manyika)
"Barbecue" - 4:48 (Collins, McClymont, Ross, Manyika)
"Flesh of My Flesh" (7" version) - 3:16 (Collins)

Personnel
Orange Juice
 Edwyn Collins  – guitar, vocals, violin, songwriting
 Malcolm Ross – guitar, vocals, keyboards, songwriting
 David McClymont – bass guitar, keyboards
 Zeke Manyika – drums, vocals, percussion, songwriting
with:
Dick Morrissey - saxophone
Martin Drover - flugelhorn
Martin Hayles - piano, synthesizer
Mel Gaynor - percussion
Louise Waddle - handclaps
Gavyn Wright - violin
Paul Quinn - vocals
Danny Cummings - percussion on "Flesh of My Flesh"
Technical
Gwyn Mathias - additional engineering
Orange Juice - sleeve design
Eric Watson - photography

References

Rip It Up
Rip It Up
Polydor Records albums